The 2013 Copa Libertadores de América (officially the 2013 Copa Bridgestone Libertadores for sponsorship reasons) was the 54th edition of the Copa Libertadores de América, South America's premier international club football tournament organized by CONMEBOL. Corinthians were the defending champions but were knocked out of the tournament by Boca Juniors in the round of 16.

For the fourth year in a row, the title was won by a Brazilian club, with Atlético Mineiro beating Paraguayan club Olimpia on penalties in the finals to win their first title. By winning the competition, Atlético Mineiro won the right to play in the 2013 FIFA Club World Cup and the 2014 Recopa Sudamericana.

Qualified teams
The following teams qualified for the tournament.

Draw

The draw of the tournament was held on 21 December 2012 in Luque, Paraguay.

For the first stage, the 12 teams were drawn into six ties containing a team from Pot 1 and a team from Pot 2, with the former hosting the second leg in three ties, and the latter hosting the second leg in the other three ties. The seeding of each team was determined by which associations reached the furthest stage in the previous Copa Libertadores.

For the second stage, the 32 teams were drawn into eight groups of four containing one team from each of the four seeding pots. The seeding of each team was determined by their association and qualifying berth (as per the rotational agreement established by CONMEBOL, the teams which qualified through berths 1 from Colombia, Ecuador, Peru and Venezuela were seeded into Pot 1 for odd-numbered years, while the teams which qualified through berths 1 from Bolivia, Chile, Paraguay and Uruguay were seeded into Pot 1 for even-numbered years). Teams from the same association in Pots 1 and 3 could not be drawn into the same group. However, a first stage winner, whose identity was not known at the time of the draw, could be drawn into the same group with another team from the same association.

Schedule
The schedule of the competition was as follows (all dates listed were Wednesdays, but matches may be played on Tuesdays and Thursdays as well).

First stage

In the first stage, each tie was played on a home-and-away two-legged basis. If tied on aggregate, the away goals rule was used. If still tied, the penalty shoot-out was used to determine the winner (no extra time was played). The winners of each tie advanced to the second stage to join the 26 automatic qualifiers.

|}

Second stage

In the second stage, each group was played on a home-and-away round-robin basis. Each team earned 3 points for a win, 1 point for a draw, and 0 points for a loss. If tied on points, the following criteria were used to determine the ranking: 1. Goal difference; 2. Goals scored; 3. Away goals scored; 4. Drawing of lots. The winners and runners-up of each group advanced to the round of 16.

Group 1

Group 2

Group 3

Group 4

Group 5

Group 6

Group 7

Group 8

Knockout stages

In the knockout stages, the 16 teams played a single-elimination tournament, with the following rules:
Each tie was played on a home-and-away two-legged basis, with the higher-seeded team hosting the second leg. However, CONMEBOL required that the second leg of the finals must be played in South America, i.e., a finalist from Mexico must host the first leg regardless of seeding.
In the round of 16, quarterfinals, and semifinals, if tied on aggregate, the away goals rule was used. If still tied, the penalty shoot-out was used to determine the winner (no extra time was played).
In the finals, if tied on aggregate, the away goals rule was not used, and 30 minutes of extra time was played. If still tied after extra time, the penalty shoot-out was used to determine the winner.
If there were two semifinalists from the same association, they must play each other.

Seeding

Bracket

Round of 16

|}

Quarterfinals

|}

Semifinals

|}

Finals

The finals were played on a home-and-away two-legged basis, with the higher-seeded team hosting the second leg. If tied on aggregate, the away goals rule was not used, and 30 minutes of extra time was played. If still tied after extra time, the penalty shoot-out was used to determine the winner.

Tied 2–2 on aggregate, Atlético Mineiro won on penalties.

Top goalscorers

See also
2013 FIFA Club World Cup
2013 Copa Sudamericana
2014 Recopa Sudamericana

References

External links

 
Copa Libertadores, CONMEBOL.com 

 
2013
1